Maurice Pézard (27 May 1876, Reims – 7 October 1923, Ceyzériat) was a French archaeologist and assyriologist.

Biographie 
He studied at the École du Louvre and presented in 1905 his thesis entitled Nouveaux faits grammaticaux d'après les collections chaldéennes du musée du Louvre.

Attached to the mission to Susa (1909) then to the Département des antiquités orientales of the Musée du Louvre, he helped Edmond Pottier in the excavations at Kedesh (1921-1922).

Works 
1912: Un nouveau poids de l'époque Kassite
1913: Catalogue des antiquités de la Susiane au musée du Louvre
1920: La Céramique archaïque de l'islam
1931: Qadesh-Mission archéologique à Tell Nebi Mend. 1921-1922, Bibliothèque archéologique et historique du Service des antiquités de Syrie

Bibliography 
 Edmond Pottier, Maurice Pézard, in Syria issue 4, 1923, (p. 344–345)
 François Pouillon, Dictionnaire des orientalistes de langue française, Karthala, 2012, (p. 803–804)
 Ève Gran-Aymerich, Les chercheurs de passé, Editions du CNRS, 2007, (p. 1057)

External links 
 Maurice Pézard on data.bnf.fr

French archaeologists
French Assyriologists
1876 births
People from Reims
1923 deaths